This is a list of people executed in the United States in 2014. Thirty-five people were executed in the United States in 2014. Ten of them were in the state of Missouri, and another ten were in the state of Texas. Two (Edgar Tamayo Arias and Ramiro Hernandez-Llanas) were foreign nationals from Mexico. One (Juan Carlos Chavez) was a foreign national from Cuba. Two (Suzanne Margaret Basso and Lisa Ann Coleman) were female.

While there were a total of 35 executions in 2014, there were 39 executions in the previous year (2013) and 28 executions in the subsequent year (2015).

List of people executed in the United States in 2014

Demographics

Executions in recent years

Notable executions
2014 was a notable year for executions. A total of ten death row inmates were executed in Missouri throughout the year, the most carried out by Missouri in a single year since capital punishment resumed in 1976. 2014 also marked the first time since 2002 in which two women were executed during a single year. Suzanne Margaret Basso and Lisa Ann Coleman, who were both sentenced to death in Texas, were executed just seven months apart. One notable execution was of convicted murderer Thomas Knight, who was executed in Florida. Knight spent thirty-nine years on death row before his execution was carried out. This set a record for the longest amount of time any inmate has spent on death row in the United States prior to being executed.

There were also three botched executions in 2014:
 Convicted killer Dennis McGuire, age 53, took nearly 30 minutes to die – the longest execution ever recorded of the 56 carried out in Ohio since capital punishment resumed in 1999. His execution led to a three year delay on executions being carried out in Ohio. The state did not execute any more inmates until July 2017.
 Convicted rapist and murderer Clayton Lockett suffered a heart attack during his execution in Oklahoma – he was pronounced dead 43 minutes after being sedated and reportedly writhed, groaned, convulsed, and spoke during the process. He also attempted to rise from the execution table 14 minutes into the procedure.
 Convicted murderer Joseph Rudolph Wood III, who was executed in Arizona, was pronounced dead 1 hour and 57 minutes after the drugs were injected into his system – the entire procedure took almost 2 hours when it should have taken about 10 minutes.

See also
 Capital punishment in the United States
 List of botched executions
 List of juveniles executed in the United States since 1976
 List of women executed in the United States since 1976
 List of United States Supreme Court decisions on capital punishment

References

List of people executed in the United States
executed
People executed in the United States
2014